Uruguay competed at the 2020 Summer Olympics in Tokyo. Originally scheduled to take place from 24 July to 9 August 2020, the Games were postponed to 23 July to 8 August 2021, due to the COVID-19 pandemic. Since the nation's official debut in 1920, Uruguayan athletes have appeared in every edition of the Summer Olympic Games, with the exception of the 1980 Summer Olympics in Moscow, because of its Uruguay's support to the United States-led boycott. Uruguay left the Olympics with no medals earned.

Competitors

Athletics

Uruguayan athletes further achieved the entry standards, by world ranking, in the following track and field events (up to a maximum of 3 athletes in each event, one man was qualified by Universality place):

Track & road events

Field events

Judo
 
Uruguay qualified one judoka for the men's half-middleweight category (81 kg) at the Games. Alain Aprahamian accepted a continental berth from the Americas as the nation's top-ranked judoka outside of direct qualifying position in the IJF World Ranking List of June 28, 2021.

Rowing

Uruguay qualified one boat in the men's lightweight double sculls for the Games by winning the gold medal and securing the first of three berths available at the 2021 FISA Americas Olympic Qualification Regatta in Rio de Janeiro, Brazil.

Qualification Legend: FA=Final A (medal); FB=Final B (non-medal); FC=Final C (non-medal); FD=Final D (non-medal); FE=Final E (non-medal); FF=Final F (non-medal); SA/B=Semifinals A/B; SC/D=Semifinals C/D; SE/F=Semifinals E/F; QF=Quarterfinals; R=Repechage

Sailing

Uruguayan sailors qualified one boat in each of the following classes through the class-associated World Championships, and the continental regattas.

M = Medal race; DSQ = Disqualified; EL = Eliminated – did not advance into the medal race

Swimming

Uruguay received a universality invitation from FINA to send two top-ranked swimmers (one per gender) in their respective individual events to the Olympics, based on the FINA Points System of June 28, 2021.

See also
Uruguay at the 2019 Pan American Games

References

Nations at the 2020 Summer Olympics
2020
2020 in Uruguayan sport